Vattapara Hairpin Turn  also known as (Vattapara accident zone) is a road and place along the Indian National Highway 66 near Valanchery, Malappuram District, Kerala, India, that is known for a high number of accidents. Over a five-year period there were 300 accidents, 200 injuries, and 30 deaths.

History 
Vattapara Hairpin Turn is located at a distance of about 4 km from Valanchery in Malappuram district, on the National Highway formerly known as NH 17 and now NH 66. The 'Vattapara bend' is an 'infamous' bend  in Vattapara between Puthanathani and Valanchery. The number of vehicles that have flipped on the turn is not tracked. There have been more than 300  road accidents in the last five years. More than 30 deaths, more than 200 injured. It is a common sight for locals to see vehicles coming and going, and firefighters ringing bells and trying to lift the vehicle. This road also called Bermuda Triangle in Malappuram district at Vattapara bend, a death trap for tanker lorries

Reason of accident 
Frequent vehicular accidents are caused by the slope of the road approaching the curve and the lack of scientificity in the construction of the curve in terms of the slope of the surface. Related to the theory of 'Banking of the Curve' (Banked turn). A vehicle speeding through a curve will still have a tendency to roll out. This is called centrifugal force. If this force survives the friction between the vehicle's tire and the road, the vehicle will fall out. This friction also depends on the speed of the vehicle, the condition of the road surface, and the load on the vehicle. Here the slope of the road is to the left. Curving vehicles are at risk by default. Tanker lorries and truckers who get off the first part at fairly good speeds at night and elsewhere without adequate warnings, or without heeding warnings, suddenly notice a single hairpin bend to the right. Most of the time, they cut to the right at once and the cart overturns to the left and the left to the left.

Ways to cope with an accident

Change traffic 

Solutions -1 is a bypass road that connects directly from Kanjipura to Valanchery Moodal before the Vattapara bend on the National Highway diverts traffic. 
Solutions - 2 The second solution is to widen the roads from Puthanathani to Thirunavaya Kuttipuram to divert traffic.

See also 
 Valanchery
 Roads in Kerala
 National Highway 66 (India)
 Traffic collisions in India
 Puthanathani
 Kuttipuram
 Banked turn

References

External links
മലപപറം വളാഞചേരിയിൽ ടാങകർ ലോറി മറിഞഞ; ആളപായമിലല - Tanker lorry overturns at Malappuram Valanchery; No crowds
Two killed in Valanchery road mishap
Accident-prone highway stretch to be redesigned | Kozhikode News - Times of India

Road incidents in India
Road accidents and incidents
Road safety
Collision
Disasters in Kerala